Alexandre Bezerra (born 25 September 1987) is a Brazilian mixed martial artist who competes in the featherweight division.

Mixed martial arts career

Early career
Bezerra made his professional MMA debut in July 2008.  He quickly established an 8-1 record over the next two years while fighting in his native Brazil. This drew the attention of Bellator Fighting Championships and he was signed with the company in 2011.

He currently trains in Philadelphia, Pennsylvania at Daddis Fight Camps and at Brazilian Jiu-Jitsu United alongside Roberto Godoi black belt and MMA fighter Wilson Reis.

Bellator Fighting Championships
Bezzera made his debut for Bellator in June 2011, fighting Sam Jones at Bellator 46. He won the fight via submission in the first round.  He subsequently fought Jesse Gross and Scott Heckman and won both fights via submission and TKO.

In his fourth Bellator fight, Bezerra defeated Doug Evans via submission in the first round.

In his fifth Bellator fight, Bezerra defeated Kenny Foster via submission in round 2 to advance to the semifinals of the Bellator Season 6 Featherweight Tournament.

In his sixth Bellator fight, Bezerra was defeated by Marlon Sandro in the Bellator Season 6 Featherweight Tournament Semifinal via split decision.

At Bellator 74, Bezerra was originally scheduled to face The Ultimate Fighter: Live alumni Jeff Smith. However, Smith failed his pre-fight medical and was replaced by Matt McCook in a 157 lb catchweight fight.

Professional Fighters League
Bezerra made his debut with the Professional Fighters League against Magomed Idrisov at PFL 7 on 30 August 2018. He won the fight via knockout due to a flying knee in the first round.

Championships and accomplishments
Cage Fury Fighting Championships
CFFC Featherweight Championship (One time)

Mixed martial arts record

|-
|Loss
|align=center|22–7
|Magomedrasul Khasbulaev
|TKO (punches)
|ACA 100: Zhamaldaev vs. Froes 2
|
|align=center|3
|align=center|1:27
|Grozny, Russia
|
|-
|Loss
|align=center|22–6
|Andre Harrison
|Decision (majority)
|PFL 8
|
|align=center|2
|align=center|5:00
|New Orleans, Louisiana, United States
|
|-
|Win
|align=center| 22–5
|Magomed Idrisov	
|KO (flying knee)
|PFL 7
|
|align=center| 1
|align=center| 3:34
|Atlantic City, New Jersey, United States
|
|-
|Win
|align=center| 21–5
|Sam Toomer
|TKO (punches)
|LFA 46
|
|align=center|2
|align=center|3:00
|Newport News, Virginia, United States
|
|-
|Win
|align=center| 20–5
|Ray Wood
|Decision (unanimous)
|NEF 29 - Stars and Stripes
|
|align=center|3
|align=center|5:00
|Lewiston, Maine, United States 
|
|-
|Loss
|align=center| 19–5
|Andre Harrison
|Decision (unanimous)
|Titan FC 41
|
|align=center|5
|align=center|5:00
|Coral Gables, Florida, United States 
|<small> For the Titan FC Featherweight Championship
|-
|Win
|align=center| 19–4
|Dimitre Ivy 
|Submission (rear naked choke)
|XCC 25 - Xtreme Caged Combat 25 
|
|align=center|1
|align=center|1:16
|Hatfield, Pennsylvania, United States 
|
|-
|Win
|align=center| 18–4
|Frank Caraballo
|TKO (punches)
|XCC 24 - Xtreme Caged Combat 24 
|
|align=center|1
|align=center|3:57
|Bethlehem, Pennsylvania, United States 
|
|-
|Loss
|align=center| 17–4
|Levan Makashvili
|Decision (unanimous)
|CFFC 44: Bezerra vs. Makashvili 2
|
|align=center|5
|align=center|5:00
|Bethlehem, Pennsylvania, United States
|Lost CCFC Featherweight Championship
|-
|Win
|align=center| 17–3
|Levan Makashvili
|Decision (majority)
|CFFC 38: Felder vs. Johnson 
|
|align=center|5
|align=center|5:00
|Atlantic City, New Jersey, United States
|Won CCFC Featherweight Championship
|-
|Win
|align=center| 16–3
|Bruno Dias
|Submission (rear-naked choke)
|Max Sport: 13.3
|
|align=center|1
|align=center|3:30
|Sao Paulo, Brazil
|
|-
|Loss
|align=center| 15–3
|Mike Richman
|Decision (split)
|Bellator 92
|
|align=center|3
|align=center|5:00
|Temecula, California, United States
|
|-
|Win
|align=center| 15–2
|Genair da Silva
|Submission (armbar)
| Bellator 88
| 
|align=center|1
|align=center|1:40
| Duluth, Georgia, United States
| 
|-
|Win
|align=center| 14–2
| Matt McCook
| Submission (rear-naked choke)
| Bellator 74
|
|align=center|1
|align=center|3:04
|Atlantic City, New Jersey, United States
|
|-
| Loss
|align=center| 13–2
|Marlon Sandro
|Decision (split)
|Bellator 64
|
|align=center|3
|align=center|5:00
|Windsor, Ontario, Canada
|
|-
| Win
|align=center| 13–1
|Kenny Foster
|Submission (rear-naked choke) 
|Bellator 60
|
|align=center|2
|align=center|4:57
|Hammond, Indiana, United States
|
|-
| Win
|align=center| 12–1
|Doug Evans
|Submission (ankle lock) 
|Bellator 57
|
|align=center|1
|align=center|4:04
|Rama, Ontario, Canada
|
|-
| Win
|align=center| 11–1
|Scott Heckman
|TKO (punches)
|Bellator 49
|
|align=center|2
|align=center|1:38
|Atlantic City, New Jersey, United States
|
|-
| Win
|align=center| 10–1
|Jesse Gross
|Submission (rear-naked choke)
|Bellator 47
|
|align=center| 1
|align=center| 1:28
|Rama, Ontario, Canada
| 
|-
| Win
|align=center| 9–1
|Sam Jones
|Submission (triangle choke)
|Bellator 46
|
|align=center| 1
|align=center| 3:27
|Hollywood, Florida, United States
|
|-
| Win
|align=center| 8–1
|Luis Rogerio de Agostinho
|Submission (rear-naked choke)
|First Class Fight 5
|
|align=center| 1
|align=center| 2:26
|Sao Paulo, Brazil
| 
|-
| Win
|align=center| 7–1
|Ivanildo Santos
|Submission (armbar)
|Ichigeki - Brazil 2010
|
|align=center| 1
|align=center| 1:58
|Sao Paulo, Brazil
| 
|-
| Win
|align=center| 6–1
|Will Martinez
|Submission (guillotine choke)
|Locked in the Cage 4
|
|align=center| 1
|align=center| 1:36
|Philadelphia, Pennsylvania, United States
|
|-
| Loss
|align=center| 5–1
|Charles Oliveira
|Submission (anaconda choke)
|First Class Fight 3
|
|align=center| 2
|align=center| 1:11
|Sao Paulo, Brazil
| 
|-
| Win
|align=center| 5–0
|Rôdrigo Ruiz
|KO (punches)
|Max Fight 6
|
|align=center| 1
|align=center| 3:23
|Sao Paulo, Brazil
|
|-
| Win
|align=center| 4–0
|Jonatas Henrique Bernardo
|KO (punch)
|First Class Fight 2
|
|align=center| 1
|align=center| 2:43
|Sao Paulo, Brazil
|
|-
| Win
|align=center| 3–0
|Sergio Soares
|Submission (rear-naked choke)
|First Class Fight 1
|
|align=center| 2
|align=center| 1:41
|Sao Paulo, Brazil
| 
|-
| Win
|align=center| 2–0
|Munil Adriano
|Decision (unanimous)
|Max Fight 5
|
|align=center| 3
|align=center| 5:00
|Salvador Bahia, Brazil
|
|-
| Win
|align=center| 1–0
|Diego Mercurio
|KO (punches)
|IFC - Vale Tudo
|
|align=center| 1
|align=center| 1:30
|Sao Paulo, Brazil
|

See also
 List of Bellator MMA alumni
 List of male mixed martial artists

References

External links
 

1987 births
Living people
Brazilian male mixed martial artists
Brazilian practitioners of Brazilian jiu-jitsu
People awarded a black belt in Brazilian jiu-jitsu
Featherweight mixed martial artists
Mixed martial artists utilizing Brazilian jiu-jitsu
Sportspeople from São Paulo